Joaquín Gómez Blasco (born 25 July 1986) is a Spanish football manager, currently in charge of Finnish club SJK.

Career
Born in Sotillo de la Adrada, Community of Madrid, Gómez started studying football and coaching at the Universidad Camilo José Cela in Madrid, where he completed two master's degrees in sports science and coaching. He completed the first one in 2010 and the other one in 2015. He also has a UEFA Pro license, which he completed in 2010. Gómez was one of the youngest people to receive the UEFA Pro license, at the age of 24.

In Madrid, Gómez coached various school teams, who played in the lower divisions of the Spanish football hierarchy. At 23, he made the decision to move to England, in pursuit of a professional career in football. He, and his wife, moved to Brighton and in the beginning, he worked in a hotel and a café, while learning the language. At the end of 2010, he received his first full time coaching job, within the Brighton & Hove Albion academy.

At Brighton, Gómez started working with the clubs U7-team, but was gradually appointed more and more responsibilities. In 2013 he was approached by Óscar García, a fellow Spaniard, to become the first team performance coach in 2013. The following season Gómez joined former Finland national Sami Hyypiä as assistant manager, before leaving at the end of the 2014–15 season to become Derby County's head of tactical analysis. At Derby County he worked with Paul Clement, who had experience from Chelsea FC, Paris Saint Germain and Real Madrid.

For the 2015–2016 season, Gómez joined Luton Town in the EFL League Two and teamed up with Nathan Jones, who had been the assistant manager under Sami Hyypiä, as well as manager after Hyypiä was sacked by Brighton. During the 2016–2017 season Luton finished fourth in their division, and the following season Luton gained promotion to league one. After a good start to the 2018–2019 season, Jones was appointed head manager for Stoke City and Gómez followed him there.

In May 2019, Gómez joined the Finland U21 national team, at a recommendation from Antti Niemi with whom he had worked with at Brighton. He continued working at Stoke City at the same time, until Jones was fired in the November 2019, after a poor start to the season. After this Gómez moved to FC Cartagena in the Spanish Segunda División B.

At the beginning of the year 2020, Gómez signed a contract with SJK Seinäjoki, to become their assistant coach under Jani Honkavaara. After a poor start to the season, SJK ended up in seventh place after a strong autumn.

On 11 January 2021, Gómez joined HIFK Fotboll as head coach.

On 8 November 2021, Gómez returned to SJK as head coach.

References

1986 births
Living people
Sportspeople from the Community of Madrid
Spanish football managers
Veikkausliiga managers
HIFK Fotboll managers
Seinäjoen Jalkapallokerho managers
Brighton & Hove Albion F.C. non-playing staff
Luton Town F.C. non-playing staff
Stoke City F.C. non-playing staff
Spanish expatriate football managers
Spanish expatriate sportspeople in England
Spanish expatriate sportspeople in Finland
Expatriate football managers in Finland